Chyžné is a village and municipality in Revúca District in the Banská Bystrica Region of Slovakia.

History
In historical records, the village was first mentioned in 1427  (1427 Hyznow, 1551 Hysnyo, 1557 Chisno, 1575 Chysne, 1584 Kysnow). It belonged to Jelšava and after to Muráň. In 1566 it was destroyed by Turks.

Genealogical resources

The records for genealogical research are available at the state archive "Statny Archiv in Kosice, Slovakia"

 Roman Catholic church records (births/marriages/deaths): 1674-1895 (parish B)
 Lutheran church records (births/marriages/deaths): 1784-1897 (parish A)

See also
 List of municipalities and towns in Slovakia

References

External links
 
 
Surnames of living people in Chyzne

Villages and municipalities in Revúca District